Long Island Medium is an American reality television series starring Theresa Caputo, a self-professed medium who claims she can communicate with the dead. Much of the program, which premiered on September 25, 2011, takes place in Hicksville, New York, though it often follows Caputo as she meets with clients in other areas.

Scientific skeptics say mediumship performances are a con, and Caputo's specific claims have been deemed fictitious by critics including magician James Randi, Inside Edition. and Jezebel.

Synopsis
Each episode focuses on Caputo as she conducts private and group readings with both believers and skeptics. Her husband Larry and two children, Victoria and Larry Jr., have learned to live with her mediumship. In a 2011 interview, Caputo claimed she could communicate with dead people: "Things are just there. When I was younger I used to actually see images and hear things. As I got older and shut down, it has changed. Because it was frightening to see people standing there who actually weren't there."

Reception
Scientific skeptics say mediumship performances are a con, and that Caputo's seemingly paranormal performances are simply the result of well-known exploits like the Forer effect, cold reading, selective editing of the show, and her subjects' eagerness to believe.

In 2012, the James Randi Educational Foundation (JREF) awarded Caputo its Pigasus Award for being, in its view, the "psychic" performer who fooled the greatest number of people with the least effort in the preceding year. A Pigasus award was also given to TLC for continuing to air the show.  In an article published by Wired Magazine the organization's founder James Randi explained why he believed shows like Long Island Medium were deceptive and potentially harmful to its participants:

In June of that year, Caputo appeared in a commercial for Priceline.com in which she portrayed herself "connecting" with the late Priceline Negotiator character previously played by William Shatner. JREF President DJ Grothe issued a statement asking Priceline.com to prove that Caputo has the abilities that she claims to possess.

Inside Edition examined Caputo's claims of being able to talk to the dead and found them lacking as she performed live, saying they "watched her strike out time and again." Mark Edward, who used to portray himself as a medium, gave his opinion that Caputo does not have supernatural powers and explained several common techniques she could be using to pretend to have such abilities. She responded in a statement: "I respect and understand skeptics. I'm not trying to prove anything to anyone, that's not why I do what I do. I feel, and have been told by my clients, that my gift has really helped them, and that's all that matters to me."

Ron Tebo, proprietor of the YouTube debunking channel SciFake, has argued that Caputo engages in several forms of deception, including sending staff members to interview audience members in advance to acquire knowledge to claim communication with the dead.

In March 2018, skeptical activist Susan Gerbic published an article in Skeptical Inquirer summarizing several techniques that she says are used by psychics such as Caputo to achieve their effects.

While noting that Caputo's claim of special powers "has been questioned", Varietys Gregg Goldstein described her in generally positive terms in a 2012 article, writing, "In an era of hit reality shows about families and denizens of New Jersey, the series' equally big selling point is the dynamic with her husband and two wisecracking teenagers, making it play like a combination of Real Housewives of New Jersey and Bewitched – particularly when their frustrations surface over her random communications with what she calls 'Spirit.

In a 2019 segment of Last Week Tonight, which featured Caputo as well as other prominent TV psychics, John Oliver criticized the media for producing shows such as this because they convince viewers that psychic powers are real, and so enable neighborhood psychics to prey on grieving families. Oliver said, "...when psychic abilities are presented as authentic, it emboldens a vast underworld of unscrupulous vultures, more than happy to make money by offering an open line to the afterlife, as well as many other bullshit services."

CastMain Theresa CaputoRecurring'
 Larry Caputo Jr.
 Victoria Caputo
 Larry Caputo

Episodes

Series Overview

Season 1 (2011)

Season 2 (2012)

Season 3 (2012)

Season 4 (2013)

Season 5 (2013)

Season 6 (2014)

Season 7 (2014)

Season 8 (2015)

Season 9 (2015–16)

Season 10 (2017)

Season 11 (2017)

Season 12 (2018)

Season 13 (2018)

Season 14 (2019)

See also

References

External links
 
 
 Theresa Caputo's site

2010s American reality television series
2011 American television series debuts
English-language television shows
TLC (TV network) original programming
Pseudoscience
Mediumship
Television shows set in New York (state)